The 2017–18 season was Swansea City's 98th season in the English football league system, and their seventh consecutive season in the Premier League. Along with competing in the Premier League, the club competed in the FA Cup and EFL Cup. The season covered the period from 1 July 2017 to 30 June 2018.

Swansea's relegation to the Championship was confirmed on 13 May 2018, the final day of the Premier League season, by virtue of them losing 2–1 at home to already relegated Stoke City, where only a win and a ten-goal difference swing over Southampton would have ensured survival.

Club

Directors

Behind the team

Squad information

First team squad

Ordered by 2017–18 squad numbers.

Transfers

Transfers in

Loans in

Transfers out

Loans out

New contracts

Pre-season friendlies

Friendlies
As of 2 June 2017, Swansea City have confirmed six pre-season friendlies against Philadelphia Union, Richmond Kickers, North Carolina in the United States, Birmingham City, Barnet and Sampdoria.

Competitions

Overview

{| class="wikitable" style="text-align: center"
|-
!rowspan=2|Competition
!colspan=8|Record
|-
!
!
!
!
!
!
!
!
|-
| Premier League

|-
| FA Cup

|-
| EFL Cup

|-
! Total

Premier League

League table

Results summary

Results by matchday

Matches

On 14 June 2017, Swansea City's Premier League fixtures were announced.

FA Cup

Swansea City joined the competition in the third round and were drawn away to Wolverhampton Wanderers.

EFL Cup

Swansea City were given another away trip in the third round against Reading.

Statistics

Appearances, goals, and cards
Last updated on 13 May 2018

References

Swansea City
Swansea City A.F.C. seasons
Welsh football clubs 2017–18 season